Events in the year 1875 in Venezuela

Incumbents
President: Antonio Guzmán Blanco

Events
October 28: Inauguration of the National Pantheon.

Deaths

 
1870s in Venezuela
Years of the 19th century in Venezuela
Venezuela
Venezuela